Sarah Strange is a Canadian actress. She has worked in a variety of American and Canadian television and film projects, including Helen in the Canadian drama Da Vinci's Inquest and as the voice actress for the male half of Ranma Saotome in the first 64 episodes of Ranma 1/2 before she was replaced by Richard Ian Cox for the rest of the series.

Life and career
Strange was born in Vancouver, British Columbia, the daughter of screenwriters Susan and Marc Strange (creators of The Beachcombers). She grew up in Canada's entertainment industry, and has appeared in comedic, dramatic, and science fiction projects on both big and small screens since graduating from high school.

In 1988, David Fincher directed her in the USA version of the music video for Shattered Dreams by Johnny Hates Jazz. She played the uncredited lead female in the black and white video.

Strange has since garnered multiple Gemini Award nominations for her acting, winning an award for her guest role in the Canadian series Neon Rider at 21. Strange is also known for playing the voice of boy-type Ranma Saotome for the OVAs, movies and first three seasons of the anime series Ranma ½. She played Jill Langston, the lead virologist in seasons 1 and 2 of the Canadian Science drama ReGenesis.

She also provided the voice of Franklin in Dinobabies and Rookie in Littlest Pet Shop.

Strange was among the cast of the ABC romantic comedy-drama Men In Trees (2006—2008), on which she portrayed the town barmaid and a reconciling wife opposite Abraham Benrubi. She also appeared on ABC's Life As We Know It (2004—2005) in the recurring role of "Mia", the mother of Kelly Osbourne's character. She also reprised her role of Ganos Lal/Morgan le Fay in the direct-to-DVD movie Stargate: The Ark of Truth. Strange has also appeared on an episode of Sanctuary titled "Kush" as Dr. Allison Grant.

From 2013 to 2019, Strange had a regular co-starring role in the Garage Sale Mysteries franchise of made-for-television movies from Hallmark.

Filmography

Film

Television

References

External links
 
 Sarah Strange biography from ABC's Men In Trees site
 Sarah Strange interview on theTVaddict.com

Canadian film actresses
Canadian television actresses
Canadian voice actresses
Living people
Actresses from Vancouver
20th-century Canadian actresses
21st-century Canadian actresses
Year of birth missing (living people)